David Whitfield (2 February 1925 – 15 January 1980) was a popular British male tenor vocalist from Hull. He became the first British artist to have a UK No.1 single in the UK and in the United States with "Cara Mia", featuring Mantovani and his orchestra. He died from a brain haemorrhage in Sydney, Australia, while on tour at the age of 54.

Life and career
Whitfield was born in Hull in the East Riding of Yorkshire. He sang in the choir at his church during his childhood and entertained his fellow members of the Royal Navy during the Second World War. After the war, he stayed on in the Navy until June 1950 having had a long spell in Singapore where he broadcast on radio. He appeared on Opportunity Knocks, a talent show on Radio Luxembourg on April 30, 1950 and won that round. He subsequently appeared on the all-winners show on May 21, 1950 singing "Good-Bye" from White Horse Inn. This led to him joining the touring stage show of "Opportunity Knocks" hosted by Hughie Green for a while. After leaving the Navy, he had taken a job in a cement factory but in 1953 he was given the opportunity to sing in a West-end cabaret at the Washington Hotel, Curzon St., London where he was a great success. This led to a variety stage tour.

His first recording to reach the Top 10 of the UK Singles Chart in October 1953 was "Bridge of Sighs", written by Billy Reid. "Answer Me" (later recorded with different lyrics as "Answer Me, My Love") reached number one in the UK. Both versions have appeared on CD.

Whitfield had other hits in the 1950s, and was the most successful British male singer in America during that period. In addition, he was the first British male vocalist to earn a gold disc and the third overall. He was also the first to reach the Top Ten of the Billboard Top 100, and the first artist from Britain to sell over a million copies of a record in the US.

All of his hits were released by the Decca record label in the UK. His only album to reach the UK Albums Chart was The World of David Whitfield, which reached Number 19. He used orchestras, including those of Stanley Black, fellow Decca artist Mantovani and Roland Shaw, as backing accompaniment for said hits.

His most popular recordings were:
 "Answer Me" – his first UK chart topper.
 "Cara Mia" – with Mantovani which earned him that gold disc and gave him his second Number One in the UK Singles Chart.
 "My September Love".
 "I'll Find You" – the theme music to the 1957 film, Sea Wife, starring Joan Collins and Richard Burton.
 "William Tell" – the theme music to the TV series, The Adventures of William Tell.

"Cara Mia" spent ten weeks at the pole position in the UK, making it one of the biggest selling British records in the pre-rock days. That recording co-credits Mantovani and his Orchestra and Chorus. Whitfield appeared on The Ed Sullivan Show and the 1954 Royal Command Performance. He continued to perform regularly across the globe, while living in Hull in the UK.

Many of his singles were issued on LP and have been reissued in recent years on CD compilations under licence. There were three 45rpm EP specials (1959–60), one entitled "The Good Old Songs" and the other two featuring numbers from "Rose Marie" and "The Desert Song," two musical shows in which Whitfield toured. On leaving Decca he recorded two singles for HMV (1962–63). His last LP, made for Philips in 1975 and entitled Hey There! It's David Whitfield, included his third recording of "Cara Mia" (he had already recorded a stereo re-make for Decca in 1966 for an album entitled Great Songs for Young Lovers). Whitfield's last single was for Denman, a coupling of "Land of Hope and Glory" and "When You Lose the One You Love" (1977).

He died from a brain haemorrhage in Sydney, Australia, while on tour at the age of 54.

A statue in the memory of Whitfield was unveiled outside of the New Theatre in Hull on 31 August 2012, before the opening night of a show celebrating the life and music of Whitfield.

Discography

See also
Early British popular music
List of artists under the Decca Records label
List of artists who reached number one on the UK Singles Chart

References

External links
45-rpm website
The World's first David Whitfield website
This is Hull website
Unofficial David Whitfield website

1925 births
1980 deaths
English male singers
Musicians from Kingston upon Hull
Royal Navy personnel of World War II
Traditional pop music singers
20th-century English singers
20th-century British male singers